The Church of St Barbara  is a Roman Catholic church situated in Valletta, Malta. The church was built to service the spiritual needs of the knights of Provence.

History
The original church was built in 1573 for the Provence Langue of the Order, it was the church of the bombardiers. It was restored in 1601 and completely rebuilt in 1739. The exterior of the new Church of St Barbara was designed by the Italian architect Romano Carapecchia. The interior was designed by the Maltese architect Giuseppe Bonici as Carapecchia died before the church was completed. 

The church building is listed on the National Inventory of the Cultural Property of the Maltese Islands.

Architecture
The church was built in the baroque style. In the centre of the façade, just above the door, one can see a large gilded statue of the Immaculate Conception. It was erected in 1904 to commemorate the jubilee of the Immaculate Conception. Internally, the church is centrally planned, having an oval dome typical of the baroque period and which is a very rare feature in local churches.

Present day
Today the church serves as the parish church for the English, French and German speaking communities. It is the only church in Malta that has services celebrated in the German and French language respectively. Also a mass in Tagalog is celebrated every Sunday.

See also

Culture of Malta
History of Malta
List of churches in Malta
Religion in Malta

References

1570 establishments in Malta
Roman Catholic churches in Malta
Buildings and structures in Valletta
National Inventory of the Cultural Property of the Maltese Islands
Church buildings of the Knights Hospitaller